Vittorio Vaser (1904–1963) was an Italian stage and film actor. He appeared in Alessandro Blasetti's 1929 film Sun about the reclamation of the Pontine Marshes. He was the son of the actor Ernesto Vaser.

Selected filmography
 Sun (1929)
 The Haller Case (1933)
 Aldebaran (1935)
 Don Bosco (1935)
 Tonight at Eleven (1938)
 The Pirate's Dream (1940)
 The Champion (1943)
 Other Times (1952)
 A Woman Alone (1956)
 Beatrice Cenci (1956)
 Rigoletto e la sua tragedia (1956)
 Warlord of Crete (1960)

References

Bibliography
 Verdone, Luca. I Film di Alessandro Blasetti. Gremese Editore, 1989.

External links

1904 births
1963 deaths
Italian male silent film actors
Italian male film actors
Italian male stage actors
Actors from Turin
20th-century Italian male actors